Frans Ludeke (born 24 April 1968) is a South African rugby union coach, currently the head coach of Japanese Top League side Kubota Spears. having previously coached the  and the  in Super Rugby. Ludeke, who coached the Bulls between 2008 and 2015, coached the side to two Super Rugby titles, in 2009 and 2010. He additionally coached the Blue Bulls and the Golden Lions in the South African Currie Cup competition.

Ludeke is the most experienced coach in Super Rugby, haven coached 149 matches, 125 Bulls and 24 Cats, in his 9-year career in the competition.

Ludeke has over 30 years of experience in coaching, having started in 1987 coaching Hoërskool Vorentoe before a brief sting coaching English clubs. In 1997 he coached the RAU Under-21 team as well as the Transvaal Under-19s with Jake White. In 1998 he was appointed coach of the RAU first team and in 1999 he became head coach of SWD Eagles. In 2000 he became assistant coach to Heyneke Meyer with the Bulls for the 2000 Super 12 season, and joined Harry Viljoen for the Springboks tour to Argentina and Europe. In 2001 he was named South Africa Under-19 coach, before being named Golden Lions head coach. He became the Cats head coach in 2001 ahead of the 2002 Super 12 season, but was sacked following a very poor season, seeing the Cats finish second to last with just 1 win. He returned to the Cats in 2006, but in a repeat of 2003, Ludeke was sacked just 1 season into his contract. It also saw his Golden Lions contract terminated with immediate effect. In November 2007, Ludeke returned to the coaching fold, being named head coach of the Bulls for the 2008 Super 14 season. It saw Ludeke remain at the helm for 8 years, which included a re-sign of his contract in 2013. However, with 1 year still on his contract, Ludeke stepped down as Bulls head coach in 2015.

In July 2015, it was announced Ludeke would join the Fiji national team coaching set-up ahead of the 2015 Rugby World Cup, working with the forwards and lineouts and kickoffs.

Personal life
In April 2013, Ludeke's wife Anelia gave birth to triplets, Juan, Micaela and Daniéle Ludeke. They also have an older daughter Izebella born in 2008.

References

Afrikaner people
Living people
South African rugby union coaches
1968 births